Gyalshing Barnyak Assembly constituency is one of the 32 assembly constituencies of Sikkim a north east state of India. Gyalshing Barnyak is part of Sikkim Lok Sabha constituency.

Members of Legislative Assembly

 2009: Man Bahadur Dahal, Sikkim Democratic Front
 2014: Sher Bahadur Subedi, Sikkim Democratic Front

Election results

2019

See also

 Gyalshing
 West Sikkim district
 List of constituencies of Sikkim Legislative Assembly

References

Assembly constituencies of Sikkim
Gyalshing district